Down for the Count is the seventh studio album by the American heavy metal band Y&T, released in 1985 by A&M Records. The album marks the band's change to a lighter sound to find success in the hair metal scene. It contains the band's biggest hit "Summertime Girls", which charted at #55 on the Billboard Hot 100. This song had initially appeared as the only studio track on the band's live album, Open Fire, released earlier in the year. The album itself peaked at #91 on the Billboard 200 on December 14, 1985. It was the last album with the original line-up of Meniketti, Alves, Kennemore and Haze, as Haze left the following year.

Reception
The AllMusic reviewer Eduardo Rivadavia gave the album two stars out of five, and criticized the band for "[joining] the perm-haired masses then issuing like dandruff out of the California dust to redefine the meaning of the word "dumb"".

Track listing

Band
Dave Meniketti – lead guitar, lead vocals
Joey Alves – rhythm guitar, backing vocals
Phil Kennemore – bass guitar, backing vocals
Leonard Haze – drums, percussion

Additional musicians
Randy Nichols - keyboards on "Summertime Girls"
John Nymann - vocals
Bill Costa - vocals
Steffen Presley - keyboards on "Hands of Time"
Claude Schnell - keyboards on "Anytime at All" and "Face Like an Angel"
Adam Day - guitar

Production
Remixed at Battery Studios (London)
Kevin Beamish - producer, engineer
Nigel James -  coordination producer, manager, direction 
Tony Platt - engineer, remixer
Bruce Barris - engineer
Geoff Gillespie - A&R
Bill Traut - management
Sally Wood - management
Lyle Schatz - management
Scott Wood - management
Quadrangle management - management
Donald Krieger - design
Neon Park - illustrations
Jeff Gold - art direction
Chuck Beeson - art direction
Mark Weiss - photography

Charts

Album

Singles

References

External links
 https://web.archive.org/web/20071011013621/http://www.meniketti.com/discography.htm

Y&T albums
A&M Records albums
1985 albums
Albums produced by Kevin Beamish
Glam metal albums